Warren Lee McCabe (August 7, 1899 – August 24, 1982) was an American Physical Chemist and is considered as one of the founding fathers of the profession of chemical engineering. He is widely known for the eponymous McCabe–Thiele method for analysis of distillation processes and his book, Unit Operations of Chemical Engineering, a major textbook.

References

External links 
NAE Website - Dr. Warren L McCabe
Chemical Engineering Turns 100

1899 births
1982 deaths
University of Michigan alumni
Polytechnic Institute of New York University faculty
American chemical engineers
20th-century American engineers